Ilyinskaya Popovka is a rural locality (a village) in Ilyinskoye Rural Settlement, Kharovsky District, Vologda Oblast, Russia. The population was 4 as of 2002.

Geography 
Ilyinskaya Popovka is located 17 km northeast of Kharovsk (the district's administrative centre) by road. Semenikha is the nearest rural locality.

References 

Rural localities in Kharovsky District